The James Dorso Wildlife Management Area, or Ruffingham Meadow, is a  Wildlife Management Area in the U.S. state of Maine, located in Searsmont and Montville and formed in the 1950s by damming Bartlett Stream near Maine State Route 3 to flood an old existing basin.

In the late-1960s, a Maine Department of Inland Fisheries and Wildlife technician, James Dorso, pioneered the use of nesting boxes in Maine to bolster and stabilize populations of wood ducks and other waterfowl species.

References

Wildlife management areas of Maine
Protected areas of Waldo County, Maine
Protected areas established in the 1950s
1950s establishments in Maine